Albert H. Venn (September 24, 1867 – August 2, 1908) was an American lacrosse player who competed in the 1904 Summer Olympics. In 1904 he was member of the St. Louis Amateur Athletic Association which won the silver medal in the lacrosse tournament. Venn committed suicide by hanging himself in 1908.

References

External links
 

1867 births
1908 suicides
American lacrosse players
Olympic silver medalists for the United States in lacrosse
Lacrosse players at the 1904 Summer Olympics
Medalists at the 1904 Summer Olympics
Suicides by hanging in Kansas